Brain is a 2011 South Korean medical drama, starring Shin Ha-kyun, Choi Jung-won, Jung Jin-young and Jo Dong-hyuk. The series revolves around a top neurosurgeon who is obsessed with success and dreams of becoming the hospital director, then finds himself embroiled in professional rivalries and an unexpected romance. The series received positive reviews, particularly for Shin Ha-kyun's performance.

It aired on KBS2 from November 14, 2011 to January 17, 2012 on Mondays and Tuesdays at 21:55 for 20 episodes.

Plot
Lee Kang-hoon (Shin Ha-kyun) is a neurosurgeon in his early 30s. He graduated from Korea's most prestigious medical school with the best grades and completed his residency. Ashamed of his poor, uneducated parents, he has sworn since he was young that he will change his own fate. He chose neurosurgery, the least popular department, because there he can easily gain privileges by making connections with senior doctors. Seo Joon-suk (Jo Dong-hyuk), who was born with everything, is the person Kang-hoon despises the most and views him as his rival. Kim Sang-chul (Jung Jin-young) is a caring, empathetic neurosurgeon professor in his mid-50s who acts as a mentor to Yoon Ji-hye (Choi Jung-won). Joon-suk likes Ji-hye, but she has feelings for Kang-hoon. The series takes a shocking turn when Kang-hoon learns that Sang-chul caused his father's death.

Cast

Main characters
 Shin Ha-kyun as Lee Kang-hoon
 Main protagonist of the series. An arrogant neurosurgeon who lives with his mother and sister, he is haunted by the death of his father when he was a child. At first he does not like Ji-hye, but grows to have feelings for her.

 Choi Jung-won as Yoon Ji-hye
 A doctor who comes from a middle-class family. She is very fond of Kim Sang-chul, whom she considers her mentor. She starts to fall for Kang-hoon.

 Jung Jin-young as Kim Sang-chul
 Head of the hospital who cares for his patients. He has a dark past involving the accidental death of Kang-hoon's father on the surgery table, with young Kang-hoon as a witness.

 Jo Dong-hyuk as Seo Joon-suk
 A doctor who comes from rich family whose maid happened to be Kang-hoon's mother. He has a crush on Ji-hye.

 Claudia Kim as Jang Yoo-jin
 The daughter of a rich man whom Kang-hoon saved. Now she is trying to seduce Kang-hoon. Yoo-jin has a 5-year-old daughter.

Supporting characters
Lee Sung-min - Go Jae-hak
Ban Hyo-jung - Hwang Young-sun
Park Chul-ho - Park In-bum
Im Ji-eun - Hong Eun-sook
Jo Soo-min - Im Hyun-jung
Kwak Seung-nam - Yang Bum-joon
Shim Hyung-tak - Jo Dae-shik
Kwon Yul  - Yeo Bong-goo
Song Ok-sook - Kim Soon-im, Kang-hoon's mother
Kim Ga-eun - Lee Ha-young, Kang-hoon's sister
Kang Ye-seo - Choi Ryu-bi
Lee Seung-joo - Dong Seung-man
Choi Il-hwa - Ahn Dong-suk
Heo Jung-gyu - Kong Duk-ki
Hong Il-kwon - Hwang Tae-sung
Ko In-beom - Jang Yoo-jin's father
Lee Hyun-woo - Park Dong-hwa (guest appearance)
Yoo Chae-yeong - Swimming instructor (guest appearance)
Marco - Man at swimming pool (guest appearance)
Lee Chan-ho - Na Jae-woong (guest appearance)
Jeon Moo-song - Kim Shin-woo (guest appearance)
Kim Young-ok - Sa Bong-ja (guest appearance)
Hwang Bum-sik - Cha Hoon-kyung (guest appearance)

Production
Lee Sang-yoon, Yoon Seung-ah, and Lee Hyun-jin were originally cast as the main characters (Lee Kang-hoon, Yoon Ji-hye and Seo Joon-suk, respectively), but after the read-through, the producers deemed them "too young" for their roles and the actors were subsequently fired. Song Seung-heon and Kim Joo-hyuk were rumored to be offered the leading role, which eventually went to Shin Ha-kyun.

Awards and nominations

References

External links
  
 
 
 

2011 South Korean television series debuts
2012 South Korean television series endings
Korean Broadcasting System television dramas
South Korean medical television series
Korean-language television shows
Television series by CJ E&M